Øvrebø is a former municipality that was located in the old Vest-Agder county in Norway. The municipality existed twice during the 19th and 20th centuries. Originally, from 1838 until 1865, the  municipality encompassed roughly the same boundaries as the present-day municipality of Vennesla. The second iteration of the municipality was only  and it corresponded to the central part of present-day Vennesla municipality. The municipal centre was the village of Skarpengland.

History
The parish of Øvrebø was established as a municipality on 1 January 1838 (see formannskapsdistrikt law). It existed as a municipality until 1865, when it was dissolved and split into two: the southeastern part of the municipality (population: 1,103) became the new municipality of Vennesla and the remainder of the municipality became Øvrebø og Hægeland (population: 1,829). On 1 July 1896 the municipality of Øvrebø was re-created when the municipality of Øvrebø og Hægeland was divided into two separate municipalities: Øvrebø (population: 888) and Hægeland (population: 843).

During the 1960s, there were many municipal mergers across Norway due to the work of the Schei Committee.  On 1 January 1964, the Eikeland area (population: 39) of Øvrebø was transferred to neighboring Songdalen municipality, while the rest of Øvrebø (population: 925) was merged with Hægeland and Vennesla to form a new, larger municipality of Vennesla.

Name
Øvrebø municipality was named after the old Øvrebø farm, since the first Øvrebø Church was built there.  The first part of the name means "upper" and second part of the name is identical with the word bœr which means "farm" and it is cognate with the Dutch language word "boer" which means "farmer".  The name therefore means "the upper farm".

Government
All municipalities in Norway, including Øvrebø, are responsible for primary education (through 10th grade), outpatient health services, senior citizen services, unemployment and other social services, zoning, economic development, and municipal roads.  The municipality was governed by a municipal council of elected representatives, which in turn elected a mayor.

Municipal council
The municipal council  of Øvrebø was made up of representatives that were elected to four year terms.  The party breakdown of the final municipal council was as follows:

See also
List of former municipalities of Norway

References

Vennesla
Former municipalities of Norway
1838 establishments in Norway
1865 disestablishments in Norway
1896 establishments in Norway
1964 disestablishments in Norway